Silver Solstice is a live album by Paul Winter Consort and friends, including organist Dorothy Papadakos, released in 2005 through the record label Living Music. In 2006, the album earned the group a Grammy Award for Best New Age Album.

Track listing
 Disc 1
 "Opening Calls" - 4:03
 "Tomorrow Is My Dancing Day" (Traditional) - 3:02
 "Sun Singer" (Halley, Winter) - 4:58
 "Wound Over All Waters" (Halley, Whittier) - 4:32
 "Kurski Funk" (Castro-Neves, Halley, Traditional, Winter) - 4:19
 "Dawnwalker" (Spillane) - 6:46
 "Before It's Too Late" (Tuncboyaciyan) - 5:21
 "Harvest Faire" (Winter) - 4:43
 "Sara"	(Berry, Traditional) - 5:33
 "Seoladh" (Traditional) - 5:15
 "Cathedral Forest" (Halley) - 5:45
 "Belly of the Whale" (Friesen, Humpback Whale, Sullivan) - 5:29
 "Solstice Tree" (Cahn, Traditional, Uirapur, Winter) - 3:28
 "Storm" - 1:12
 "Bells of Solstice" (Traditional) - 1:33
 "Return of the Sun" (Halley) - 1:26
 "Solstice Chant" (Halley) - 2:14

Disc 2
 "Caravan at Dawn" (Hart, Rudess, Tuncboyaciyan, Winter) - 6:23
 "The Lake" (Halley) - 4:33
 "Luiza" (Jobim) - 2:41
 "Canyon Chaconne" (Halley, Winter) - 6:27
 "First Ride" (Friesen, Halley) - 4:34
 "Icarus" (Towner) - 3:14
 "The Rain Is Over and Gone" (Halley) - 5:48
 "The Cello and the Pipes" (Friesen, Spillane) - 3:55
 "The Rising Moon" (Sullivan) - 5:05
 "Down in Belgorod" (Castro-Neves, Friesen, Halley, Winter) - 3:39
 "Oror Bubrik" (Tuncboyaciyan) - 6:17
 "Silent Night" (Traditional) - 3:00
 "Song for the World" (Halley, Traditional) - 3:18
 "Wolf Eyes" (Darling, Timber Wolf, Winter) - 8:12
 "Minuit/Auld Lang Syne" (Fodeba, Guth, Osborn, Traditional) - 5:43

References

2005 live albums
Grammy Award for Best New Age Album
Paul Winter Consort albums